Aristotelia billii is a moth of the family Gelechiidae. It is found in France.

References

Moths described in 2013
Aristotelia (moth)
Moths of Europe